New Hanover County is a county located in the U.S. state of North Carolina. As of the 2020 census, the population was 225,702. Though the second-smallest NC county in land area, it is one of the most populous, as its county seat, Wilmington, is one of the state's largest cities. The county was created in 1729 as New Hanover Precinct and gained county status in 1739. New Hanover County is included in the Wilmington, NC Metropolitan Statistical Area, which also includes neighboring Pender County.

History
Located in the Low Country or Tidewater of North Carolina, the county was formed in 1729 as New Hanover Precinct of Bath County, from Craven Precinct. It was named for the House of Hanover, a German royal family then ruling Great Britain.

In 1734 parts of New Hanover Precinct became Bladen Precinct and Onslow Precinct. With the abolition of Bath County in 1739, all of its constituent precincts became counties.

In 1750 the northern part of New Hanover County became Duplin County. In 1764 another part of New Hanover County was combined with part of Bladen County to form Brunswick County. Finally, in 1875 the separation of northern New Hanover County to form Pender County reduced it to its present dimensions. The county was developed as plantations, largely for the cultivation of tobacco and other commodity crops by enslaved African Americans.

By 1860, the county seat and county were majority-black in population, with most of those people enslaved. Some of the closing battles of the American Civil War took place in this county, including the Second Battle of Fort Fisher (the last major coastal stronghold of the Confederacy) and the Battle of Wilmington. White Democrats were resentful when freedmen were given the vote.

Following the Reconstruction era, white Democrats regained control of the state legislature and continued to impose white supremacy across the state through Jim Crow laws. Violence by whites against blacks increased in the late 19th century, with 22 lynching deaths of African Americans recorded before the mid-20th century.

Racial terrorism on a larger scale took place in the Wilmington Insurrection of 1898, when a group of white Democrats rejected a duly elected, biracial city government. After overthrowing the Fusionist government, the mayor and city council, they led mobs that rioted and attacked the city's black neighborhoods and residents. A total of 60 to 300 blacks are believed to have been killed in the rioting, leaders were driven out of the city, and the presses of a black-owned newspaper were destroyed, along with many houses and businesses.

The insurrection was planned by a group of nine conspirators, who included Hugh MacRae. He later donated land to New Hanover County for a park; it was named in his honor. A plaque was installed there explaining the donation and his life; it does not refer to his role in the 1898 coup d'état.

Soon after, the state passed a new constitution raising barriers to voter registration: this effectively disenfranchised most blacks and imposed Jim Crow laws, forcing blacks out of the political system and into legal second-class status. These civil rights injustices were largely maintained into the 1960s, three generations later.

Geography

It is the second-smallest county in North Carolina by land area (ahead of only Chowan County).

Islands
 Eagle Island
 Pleasure Island
 Figure Eight Island
 Masonboro Island
 Wrightsville Beach
 Zeke’s Island

Major water bodies 
 Atlantic Ocean
 Banks Channel
 Bradley Creek
 Brunswick River
 Cape Fear River
 Frying Pan Shoals
 Futch Creek
 Greenfield Lake
 Howe Creek
 Intracoastal Waterway
 Lake Sutton
 Leutze Lake
 Northeast Cape Fear River
 Onslow Bay
 Smith Creek
 Snow's Cut
 Whiskey Creek

State and Local protected areas/sites 
 Airlie Gardens
 Battleship North Carolina
 Battery Buchanan
 Bellhammon Tract (part)
 Bluethenthal Wildflower Preserve
 Carolina Beach State Park
 Federal Point
 Fort Fisher State Historic Site
 Fort Fisher State Recreation Area
 Masonboro Island Estuarine Reserve Dedicated Nature Preserve
 Masonboro Island Reserve
 Masonboro Sound Area Outstanding Resource Water
 New Hanover County Arboretum
 Pages Creek Park Preserve
 South of Onslow County Mechanical Harvesting of Oysters Prohibited Area (part)
 The Rocks at Fort Fisher
 Topsail Sound and Middle Sound Area Outstanding Resource Water
 Wilmington Historic District
 Zekes Island Estuarine Reserve Dedicated Nature Preserve (part)
 Zeke's Island Reserve (part)

Adjacent counties
 Pender County - north
 Brunswick County - west

Major highways
 
 
 
  (To be the Military Cutoff Extension and the Hampstead Bypass, ending in Pender County)

Major infrastructure 
 Amtrak Thruway (Forden Station)
 Cape Fear Public Transportation Authority
 Fort Fisher - Southport Ferry (To Brunswick County)
 Pilots Ridge, small private airport near Myrtle Grove
 Port of Wilmington
 Wilmington International Airport

Demographics

2020 census

As of the 2020 United States census, there were 225,702 people, 100,189 households, and 56,160 families residing in the county.

2000 census
As of the census of 2000, there were 160,307 people, 68,183 households, and 41,591 families residing in the county.  The population density was 806 people per square mile (311/km2).  There were 79,616 housing units at an average density of 400 per square mile (155/km2).  The racial makeup of the county was 79.91% White, 16.97% Black or African American, 0.39% Native American, 0.83% Asian, 0.06% Pacific Islander, 0.79% from other races, and 1.05% from two or more races.  2.04% of the population were Hispanic or Latino of any race. 14.3% were of English, 13.0% United States or American, 10.6% German and 10.2% Irish ancestry according to Census 2000.

There were 68,183 households, out of which 26.10% had children under the age of 18 living with them, 46.50% were married couples living together, 11.50% had a female householder with no husband present, and 39.00% were non-families. 28.90% of all households were made up of individuals, and 8.50% had someone living alone who was 65 years of age or older.  The average household size were 2.29 and the average family size was 2.83.

In the county, the population was spread out, with 21.00% under the age of 18, 12.00% from 18 to 24, 30.50% from 25 to 44, 23.70% from 45 to 64, and 12.80% who were 65 years of age or older.  The median age was 36 years. For every 100 females there were 93.30 males.  For every 100 females age 18 and over, there were 90.70 males.

The median income for a household in the county was $40,172, and the median income for a family was $50,861. Males had a median income of $35,801 versus $25,305 for females. The per capita income for the county was $23,123.  About 8.30% of families and 13.10% of the population were below the poverty line, including 15.70% of those under age 18 and 9.00% of those age 65 or over.

Law and government
New Hanover is considered a fairly evenly divided county in political terms, favoring Democrats and Republicans in near equal measure. In the 2004 presidential elections, the county supported George W. Bush over John Kerry by 56% to 44%. On that same day, it voted by 53% to 45% to re-elect Democratic Governor Mike Easley against local Republican Patrick J. Ballantine.

New Hanover County is primarily represented in the U.S. House of Representatives by the Republican David Rouser, who represents North Carolina's 7th congressional district.  In 2012, a portion of Northwestern and Central New Hanover County was redistricted to the North Carolina's 3rd congressional district, which was represented by the Republican Walter B. Jones before his death, and in the 9th Senate district in the North Carolina Senate by Sen. Michael V. Lee (R). Of its three members of the North Carolina House of Representatives, they represent the 18th, 19th, and 20th House districts, two are Republicans, and one is a Democrat.

New Hanover County is a member of the regional Cape Fear Council of Governments.

Politics
Following the Civil War, New Hanover County was relatively Republican leaning, with it voting for the Republican candidate in all but one election from 1868 to 1896. However, it transitioned into a typical "Solid South" county between 1900 and 1968 with the exception of 1928, when Herbert Hoover carried it due to anti-Catholic sentiment against Democratic nominee Al Smith. However, Democratic strength began to erode in the 1950s: Adlai Stevenson carried it in 1952 by only 5.08%, again in 1956 by 3.94%, John F. Kennedy in 1960 by 14.84%, and Lyndon B. Johnson in 1964 by 1.8%, before flipping to Richard Nixon in 1968. Between 1968 and 2016, only one Democrat – fellow Southerner Jimmy Carter in 1976 – would win the county until 2020 when it was narrowly carried by Joe Biden. In the lead-up to the 2020 election, it was considered a bellwether and swing county due to its high population of elderly and African American voters.

Education

The county is served by New Hanover County Schools.

Healthcare
New Hanover Regional Medical Center is a hospital in Wilmington. It was established in 1967 as a public hospital, and it was the first hospital in the city to admit patients of all races. It was operated by New Hanover County. In February 2021 Novant Health, a nonprofit private organization, acquired the hospital.

Communities

City
 Wilmington (county seat and largest city)

Towns
 Carolina Beach
 Kure Beach
 Wrightsville Beach

Census-designated places

 Bayshore
 Castle Hayne
 Hightsville
 Kings Grant
 Kirkland
 Murraysville
 Myrtle Grove
 Ogden
 Sea Breeze
 Silver Lake
 Skippers Corner
 Wrightsboro

Unincorporated community
 Monkey Junction

Former communities 
 Masonboro
 Seagate
 Wilmington Beach

Townships 
 Cape Fear
 Federal Point
 Harnett
 Masonboro
 Wilmington

Notable people

 Basketball star Michael Jordan
Meadowlark Lemon (Harlem Globetrotters)

See also
 List of counties in North Carolina
 National Register of Historic Places listings in New Hanover County, North Carolina
 Films and television shows produced in Wilmington, North Carolina
 Cape Fear Museum
 Frying Pan Shoals Light, old lighthouse south of Fort Fisher
 North Carolina State Parks
 North Carolina Ferry System
 North Carolina Aquarium at Fort Fisher
 List of future Interstate Highways
 Federal Point Light, deactivated lighthouse that used to be located at Fort Fisher
 GenX, chemical compound found in the Cape Fear River south of Fayetteville

References

External links

 
 
 NCGenWeb New Hanover County - free genealogy resources for the county

 
Cape Fear (region)
1739 establishments in North Carolina
Populated places established in 1739